Terrence Lewis or Terence Lewis may refer to:

 Terence Lewis (choreographer), Indian dancer and choreographer
 Terrence Lewis (basketball), American-New Zealand former professional basketball player